Donald Scrimgeour Mackay (born 19 March 1940) is a Scottish former professional football player and manager.

Managerial career
After a spell coaching the Bristol City youth team between 1974 and 1978, where he was part of the backroom staff that won promotion to the then English First Division, he began his management career in Denmark with Nørresundby managing the local side Norresundby, gaining promotion in his first season there. He returned to Scotland in 1980 when he was appointed manager of Dundee, winning promotion to the Scottish Premier Division with the club, again in his first season in charge. After several high-profile departures from the Dundee first team, Mackay eventually left the club in 1983.
 
After a short time away from the game, Bobby Gould approached him to be his assistant at Coventry City. Gould was sacked after a poor run of results and Mackay was asked to take charge, where the club staved off relegation by famously winning their last three games of the season, to retain their First Division status.

Following the sack at Coventry, Mackay went to work as reserve-team coach at Rangers, alongside ex playing colleague Walter Smith and the manager Graeme Souness. Despite a successful spell at Rangers, Mackay wanted to manage in his own right, and therefore moved onto Blackburn Rovers. They narrowly missed the play-offs in his first season in charge, but did win the Full Members Cup, beating First Division Chelsea, Oxford United and Charlton Athletic along the way.

In the next two seasons at Blackburn they made the playoffs, losing out on promotion both times. Following a relatively poor final season in charge (1990–91), he was relieved of his position early in the next season and went on to manage Fulham. His first season at Fulham was promising but results deteriorated the following year and following a defeat at Leyton Orient he was dismissed, results did not improve and Fulham were eventually relegated to the Fourth Division.
 
Mackay then worked as a scout for Arsenal, where he discovered the young Freddie Ljungberg. Mackay then had a stint as chief scout of St Johnstone. He then teamed up with Steve Archibald at Airdrie. Despite the financial difficulties experienced by the club, they won the Scottish Challenge Cup in their only season in charge.
 
He was employed by Middlesbrough as a scout from December 2001 through to June 2007, before moving to join Leicester City under Martin Allen. His role as sporting director was short-lived, however.

Playing career
He was a goalkeeper and played for Forfar Athletic and made 104 appearances. He was then signed for Dundee United by Jerry Kerr, for whom he made 243 appearances. This is still the second highest number of appearances made by a goalkeeper for Dundee United, behind Hamish McAlpine. Mackay was then given a free transfer by Jim McLean, after ten years with Dundee United. Mackay finished his 16-year professional playing career with Southend United after 13 appearances.

Career statistics

Manager

Honours
Blackburn Rovers
Full Members' Cup: 1986–87

External links

References

1940 births
Living people
Footballers from Glasgow
Scottish footballers
Scottish expatriate footballers
Scottish expatriate football managers
Association football goalkeepers
Forfar Athletic F.C. players
Dundee United F.C. players
Dallas Tornado players
Southend United F.C. players
Scottish Football League players
United Soccer Association players
English Football League players
Scottish football managers
Dundee F.C. managers
Coventry City F.C. managers
Blackburn Rovers F.C. managers
Fulham F.C. managers
Airdrieonians F.C. (1878) managers
Rangers F.C. non-playing staff
Middlesbrough F.C. non-playing staff
Arsenal F.C. non-playing staff
St Johnstone F.C. non-playing staff
Scottish Football League managers
Expatriate soccer players in the United States
Scottish expatriate sportspeople in the United States